Jasrotia is a Dogra Rajput warrior clan from the Jammu region of India, of Suryavanshi lineage, following Sanatan [Dharma]].

Jasrotia surname is derived from Jasrota in Hiranagar tehsil which was capital of Jasrota kingdom till 1815 where they once ruled. Their members inhabit in the Indian states of Himachal Pradesh, Jammu and Kashmir and Punjab. Defence services have remained their first choice of profession and are largely found working in the Indian Army, Indian Navy and Indian Airforce.

The major group of Jasrotia Rajputs are found in Mandi in the Poonch district.

Gallantry Award Recipients

Ashok Chakra
Captain Arun Singh Jasrotia, AC, SM was born on 16 August 1968 martyrdom 15 September was son of Lt. Col. Prabhat Singh Jasrotia and Smt. Satya Devi and born at Sujanpur in Pathankot district of Punjab.
In Lolab Valley, Kashmir Captain Arun Singh
Jasrotia was leading a patrol party when suddenly they were attacked. Immediately with his commando knife and grenades he neutralized four terrorists but succumbed to gun wound injuries in the skirmishes. He was posthumously awarded  Ashoka Chakra and Sena Medal.

Sena Medal
Major Ajay Singh Jasrotia SM was born on 31 March 1972 martyrdom 15 June 1999  was son of IG BSF Arjun Singh Jasrotia and Smt. Veena and born at Gandhi Nagar in Jammu city.
In Op Vijay, Kargil Maj. Ajay commanded 13 JAK who were tasked to capture Tololing. While on his way they were caught off hand by enemy shelling. He decided evacuation of injured amidst shelling and personnely saved the lives of six  injured soldiers who later survived but he couldn't due to a  fatal shell hit wound while rescuing. He was given the gallantry award, “Sena Medal” posthumously for his valour, devotion to duty, fighting spirit and supreme sacrifice.

References

Social groups of Jammu and Kashmir